Surojit Chatterjee (the spelling reads Surajit Caţţōpādhyāy.) is an Indian Bengali singer-songwriter, music director, songwriter and the lead singer of Bengali band Bhoomi and owner of his solo band Surojit O Bondhura. He has won the Radio Mirchi Music Award as the Best Male vocalist of the year 2012 and 2013 for his album titled Folkira (Times Music). He has also directed music for the following Bengali movies like Ichhe, Muktodhara, Handa and Bhonda.

Early life

Surojit Chatterjee born in Rampurhat, started his schooling from Birbhum and after that he was admitted to Julien Day High School, Kolkata. He started playing tabla at the age of seven and graduated from Allahabad University with distinction for consecutive eight years. He has learnt to play guitar from Tuhin Chatterjee and after that went on to further guitar expertise and took guidance and learnt techniques from guitarist Amyt Datta. His first band was Grassroot which he formed during his college days and that went on to win many awards in inter-college competitions.

Bhoomi
Surojit Chatterjee formed the Bengali band Bhoomi along with his co–partner Soumitra Ray in the year 1999 which took its first stage on 24 July 1999 at the Gyan Manch Auditorium, Kolkata. Bhoomi has managed to reach the homes of rural as well as urban Bengal, with the simplicity of their lyrics and rhythmic music. It has released 12 popular albums for the past 12 years.

Surojit O Bondhura

Surojit Chatterjee formed his first solo band Surojit O Bondhura in the year 2012 with the best musicians from Kolkata. He has won the Radio Mirchi best male vocalist of the year 2012 for his first solo album Surojit O Bondhura and Radio Mirchi Best Album of the year 2013 for its album Folkira. His second solo album Abhyontoreen. This band has also released Folk Konnection, from Asha Audio and Amaar Poran Jaha Chay from Bhabna records in the year 2016.

Personal life
He is married to Kamalinee Chatterjee who has also penned many songs not only for the Surojit O Bondhura Albums, Kon Roopnagare Konnya Tomar Bari, and Abhyaontoreen and has won the Upcoming Lyricist of the year 2012 for the film Muktodhara, for the song ALO. They have a daughter named Annweshaa Chatterjee.

Filmography

Discography (Surojit O Bondhura)

Discography (Bhoomi)
 Jatra Shuru (2000)
 Udaan (2001)
 Isspecial (2002)
 Paal Chhutechhe (2003)
 Lokogeeti Local (2004)
 Dekhtey Dekhtey (2004)
 Bojhai Kora Ganer Gari (2005)
 Gaan Bahan (2007) (includes the song written in English especially for the UN performance "For A Better Day")
 Lokegeetir Deshe (2008)
 Aamra Notun Jouboner Doot (2009) (Rabindrasangeet by Bhoomi)
 Gaan Doriyae (2010) (Released 8 September)
 Desh Judey (2011) (Hindustani folk songs)

References

External links
 
 Surojit Chatterjee at reverbnation.com
 Official Facebook Page 
 Official Twitter Account

Musicians from Kolkata
Indian folk musicians
World music musicians
Living people
1966 births